Kalno  is a village in the administrative district of Gmina Żarów, within Świdnica County, Lower Silesian Voivodeship, in south-western Poland.

The village has an approximate population of 320.

References

Kalno